Ahmad Shahi Pavilion is located in the Niavaran Complex, in the north of Tehran, Iran. Ahmad Shahi Pavilion is beside Mohammad Reza Pahlavi's dwelling, Niavaran Palace and the oldest building there, Sahebgharaniyeh Palace. The Pavilion was built at the end of the Qajar era as Ahmad Shah's dwelling among Niavaran garden. Ahmad Shahi Pavilion was constructed as a two-story building in the surrounds of 800 m2 of land.this Pavilion built in 1910s

The Ahmad Shahi pavilion, after refurbishment and interior additions, was utilized as the house and workplace of Reza Pahlavi by wholly altering its furniture during the Mohammad Reza Pahlavi. The first floor of the pavilion includes of a hallway with a pond made of marble stone in the middle with six rooms and two corridors around. ornamental items made of silver, bronze, ivory, wood and souvenirs from different countries such as India, paintings, medals, etc. have been exhibited in this palace. Also other items plus decorative mineral stones, a stone from Moon, different plant and animal fossils are kept in this pavilion. The 2nd floor of this building includes of a middle hallway and a four sided veranda. All around the major hall, which was used as the song room, wooden shelves have been set. Surrounding the veranda, shelter is provided by six square brick columns and 26 round gypsum columns. The gypsum work pattern of lion and sun can be visible on the northern wall of the veranda. Ahmad Shahi Pavilion is open to public visitors.

Gallery

See also 
 Sahebgharaniyeh Palace
 Niavaran Complex

References

External links

 Niavaran Palace Website
 A short video of the Niavaran Palace Complex, YouTube,  (9 min).

Palaces in Tehran
Royal residences in Iran
National museums of Iran
Buildings and structures completed in 1968
Persian gardens in Iran
Museums in Tehran
Buildings of the Qajar period